Charles Collignon may refer to:
 Charles Collignon (fencer)
 Charles Collignon (surgeon)